Milestone is a town in southeast Saskatchewan, Canada, on Saskatchewan Highway 39.  The town was named after C. W. Milestone (superintendent of  the New Soo Line) in 1893.  The town serves as a service centre for the neighbouring countryside with the area's economy dominated by agriculture.

Two churches offer services; Milestone Alliance Church, and The Lighthouse Church.
Other facilities provided within the town include a public pool, campground, ice rink and various shops and services.

Demographics 

Education
Milestone Elementary School teaches Kindergarten to Grade 4 while Milestone High School offers classes up to Grade 12.

See also 

 List of communities in Saskatchewan
 List of towns in Saskatchewan

References

External links

Towns in Saskatchewan
Caledonia No. 99, Saskatchewan
Division No. 2, Saskatchewan